Grand-Lahou Department is a department of Grands-Ponts Region in Lagunes District, Ivory Coast. In 2021, its population was 155,832 and its seat is the settlement of Grand-Lahou. The sub-prefectures of the department are Ahouanou, Bacanda, Ebonou, Grand-Lahou, and Toukouzou.

History
Grand-Lahou Department was created in 1988 as a first-level subdivision via a split-off from Abidjan Department.

In 1997, regions were introduced as new first-level subdivisions of Ivory Coast; as a result, all departments were converted into second-level subdivisions. Grand-Lahou Department was included in Lagunes Region.

In 2011, districts were introduced as new first-level subdivisions of Ivory Coast. At the same time, regions were reorganised and became second-level subdivisions and all departments were converted into third-level subdivisions. At this time, Grand-Lahou Department became part of Grands-Ponts Region in Lagunes District.

Notes

Departments of Grands-Ponts
1988 establishments in Ivory Coast
States and territories established in 1988